The Cabinet Secretary for Education and Skills, commonly referred to as the Education Secretary, is a position in the Scottish Government Cabinet responsible for all levels of education in Scotland. The Cabinet Secretary is supported by the Minister for Further Education, Higher Education and Science and the Minister for Children and Young People which are both junior ministerial posts.

The current Cabinet Secretary for Education and Skills is Shirley-Anne Somerville, who assumed office on 20 May 2021.

History 
The position was created in 1999 as the Minister for Children and Education; it was renamed as the Minister for Education, Europe and External Affairs in 2000 and given more responsibilities; those were taken away from the post in 2001 and it was renamed again as the Minister for Education and Young People. The current position of Cabinet Secretary was created following the 2007 election.

Overview

Responsibilities
The responsibilities of the Cabinet Secretary for Education and Skills include:

 school standards, quality and improvement
 school infrastructure & staffing
 educational attainment, qualifications and closing the attainment gap
 National Improvement Framework
 teaching profession
 behaviour and measures to combat bullying
 modern languages and the Gaelic and Scots languages
 Named Person
 Skills Development Scotland
 non-advanced vocational skills
 historical abuse enquiry

Public bodies
The following public bodies report to the Cabinet Secretary for Education and Skills:
 Bòrd na Gàidhlig
 Care Inspectorate
 Children's Hearings Scotland
 Education Scotland
 Scottish Children's Reporter Administration
 Scottish Further and Higher Education Funding Council
 Scottish Qualifications Authority
 Scottish Social Services Council
 Student Awards Agency for Scotland

List of Office holders

References

Education in Scotland
Education
Higher education in Scotland